Domme is a commune in the Dordogne department in Nouvelle-Aquitaine in southwestern France. It is sometimes called the "Acropolis of the Périgord".

Geography

With its trapezoid city plan, Domme is a bastide (a fortified medieval town) adapted to the surrounding terrain, and thus falling short of the rectangular city plan characteristic to bastides.

Today a member of the association Les Plus Beaux Villages de France ("The Most Beautiful Villages of France"), Domme has two public spaces of medieval origin: the commercial Place de la Halle ("Market Hall Square") and the Place de La Rode, where the breaking wheel entertained the public.  There were two other notable locations in the village: the fair and the moneyer's house.

History

Founded as a stronghold in 1281 by Philip the Bold following his campaign along the Dordogne river, Domme obtained the privilege of minting its own currency.

In 1307, many Knights Templar were imprisoned in Domme during the trial against them, of which hundreds of Templar graffiti still bear witness.  They used a code system involving series of geometric figures: the octagon represented the Grail, the triangle surmounted by a cross represented Golgatha, the square represented the Temple, and the circle represented the imprisonment.  Similar inscriptions (of disputed authenticity) have been found in other towns such as Loches, Gisors, and Chinon.

During the Hundred Years' War, the bastide was coveted by the English who first took the town in 1347 and repeatedly changed rulers throughout the war until 1437 when it finally fell under French rule again.

The Wars of Religion brought new turmoil.  Protestants took the city in 1588 by climbing the cliffs at night to open the gates.  A short success, as the Protestant captain had to hand the bastide in which he was entrenched back to the Catholics in 1592.  The city then witnessed popular revolts (Jacquerie des Croquants) in 1594 and 1637.

Domme prospered during the seventeenth century only to decline thereafter, which greatly facilitated its preservation in modern time.

Population

Points of interest
Domme is famous for its fortifications, which were completed by 1310. The Porte des Tours with the main entrance loads to two drum-shaped towers of stone on the east and west part of the wall. The walls, first completed in 1310, contain two more gates.

The halle, first erected in the 17th century and rebuilt in 1954, faces towards the marketplace, the Place de la Halle. The Maison du Gouverneur, on the opposite side of the Place de la Halle, is a fortress-like building with tower and turrets, first built in the 15th century and expanded in the 17th.

In movies
The village, including the church and the ramparts, served as a shooting location for Le Tatoué by Denys de La Patellière with Jean Gabin and Louis de Funès in 1968.

Notable residents
Christiaan Cornelissen, born in 1864 in Bois-le-Duc, the Netherlands, died in 1942 in Domme. He was a Dutch libertarian communist teacher, author and economist.

See also
Communes of the Dordogne department

References

Communes of Dordogne
Plus Beaux Villages de France